Rohit Khare is an Indian American computer scientist and entrepreneur who has been active in many aspects of the development of the World Wide Web.  He is the founder of Ångströ, the co-founder of KnowNow, a former director of CommerceNet Labs and a key player in the microformats community.  He holds a Ph.D. from the University of California, Irvine and bachelor's degree from Caltech, both in Computer Science.  He previously worked on Internet security for the W3C. He is active in the Representational State Transfer (ReST) community, and in August 2007 wrote the ARRESTED paper on syndication-oriented architecture, a variant of service-oriented architecture.

References

External links 
 Rohit Khare's profile at ångströ.com
 Rohit Khare's Biography on the CommerceNet wiki
 Rohit Khare's homepage at UCI
 4K Associates, a collection point for Rohit's online activities, including the FoRK mailing list

Year of birth missing (living people)
Living people
Silicon Valley people
University of California, Irvine alumni
California Institute of Technology alumni
American computer scientists
American businesspeople
Computer security specialists
People from Sunnyvale, California